Massimo Beghetto (born 19 November 1968) is the Italian former professional footballer who played as a defender. He briefly coached of Vicenza Calcio and Bassano.

Playing career
Beghetto was born in Tombolo. A defender, he played for Venezia, Bologna, Chievo, Perugia, Vicenza Calcio, Dundee, Sliema Wanderers, Bassano. Whilst at Vicenza he won the 1996–97 Coppa Italia.

Coaching career
In the season 2010–11 he has been assistant coach to Rolando Maran at Serie B club Vicenza Calcio, after having served as head coach of Bassano Virtus 55 S.T. during the club's 2009–10 campaign.

Since 4 March to 29 April 2012, when he was sacked, has been the coach of Vicenza Calcio, in place of the sacked Luigi Cagni, after that in the same season has coached the youth team.

Personal life
His father, Giuseppe is a former Olympic champion, and both his brother Luigi and his son Andrea are professional footballers.

Honours

Player
Vicenza
Coppa Italia: 1996–97

References

1968 births
Living people
Italian footballers
Association football defenders
Serie A players
Serie B players
Serie C players
Scottish Premier League players
Calcio Montebelluna players
Venezia F.C. players
Bologna F.C. 1909 players
A.C. ChievoVerona players
A.C. Perugia Calcio players
L.R. Vicenza players
Dundee F.C. players
Sliema Wanderers F.C. players
Bassano Virtus 55 S.T. players
Italian football managers
Bassano Virtus 55 S.T. managers
L.R. Vicenza managers
Italian expatriate footballers
Italian expatriate sportspeople in Scotland
Expatriate footballers in Scotland
Italian expatriate sportspeople in Malta
Expatriate footballers in Malta